The 2019 IIHF Women's U18 World Championship was the 12th Women's U18 World Championship in ice hockey. It was played at the Obihiro Arena in Obihiro, Japan from 6 to 13 January.

Top Division

Preliminary round
All times are local (UTC+9).

Group A

Group B

Relegation round
The third and fourth placed team from Group B will play a best-of-three series to determine the relegated team.

Final round

Bracket

Quarterfinals

Semifinals

Fifth place game

Bronze medal game

Gold medal game

Final ranking

Statistics

Scoring leaders

GP = Games played; G = Goals; A = Assists; Pts = Points; +/− = Plus-minus; PIM = Penalties In MinutesSource: IIHF

Goaltending leaders
(minimum 40% team's total ice time)

TOI = Time On Ice (minutes:seconds); GA = Goals against; GAA = Goals against average; SA = Shots against; Sv% = Save percentage; SO = ShutoutsSource: IIHF

Awards
Best players selected by the directorate:
Best Goaltender:  Saskia Maurer
Best Defenceman:  Alexie Guay
Best Forward:  Elisa Holopainen
Source: IIHF

Media All-Stars:
MVP:  Raygan Kirk
Goaltender:  Saskia Maurer
Defencemen:  Alexie Guay /  Nelli Laitinen
Forwards:  Elisa Holopainen /  Katy Knoll /  Ilona Markova
Source: IIHF

Division I

Group A

The Group A tournament was held in Radenthein, Austria from 7 to 13 January 2019.

Group B

The Group B tournament was held in Dumfries, Great Britain from 6 to 12 January 2019.

Group B qualification

The Group B Qualification tournament is being held in Jaca, Spain from 12 to 18 January 2019.  For 2020 it was decided to create a Division II and split the teams into two groups.  The teams that did not make the semifinals were essentially relegated to Division IIB.

References

IIHF World Women's U18 Championships
2018–19 in Japanese ice hockey
2018–19 in women's ice hockey
International ice hockey competitions hosted by Japan
Sport in Hokkaido
IIHF World Women's U18